Prof. R. K. Kohli is an Indian educational administrator. He is Vice-Chancellor of Amity University Punjab, Mohali since August 22, 2020. Prior to join the Amity University, Mohali. He worked as second Vice chancellor of Central University Punjab (2014–20). He has also worked as founder Vice Chancellor of DAV University, Jalandhar (2013–14). He has 47 years experience of teaching and research since July 1975.
He is an elected Fellow of the Indian National Science Academy, New Delhi (2011), The Indian Academy of Sciences, Bengaluru (2010), National Academy of Sciences (India), Allahabad (now Prayagraj) (2004), National Academy of Agricultural Sciences, New Delhi, (2005), National Environmental Science Academy, New Delhi (2003)

Education
Kohli did his Doctoral research on 'Physiological and Biochemical Changes during Floral Initiation in Amaranthus"' in 1979 GNDU Amritsar.

Books

References

1953 births
Living people
20th-century Indian educational theorists
Writers from Haryana
20th-century Indian educators
Scholars from Haryana
Heads of universities and colleges in India